Granadillo may refer to:

 Brya ebenus, a species of flowering tree native to Cuba and Jamaica
 Dalbergia granadillo, a tree species native to Mexico and El Salvador
 Dalbergia retusa, a tree species native to Central America
 Hypericum canariense, a species of St. John's wort
 Zygia pithecolobioides (Granadillo de Río), a tree species in the legume family (Fabaceae)